Uppugundur is a village in the Prakasam district Naguluppalapadu mandal of Andhra Pradesh.
Population as of 2011 census

References

Villages in Prakasam district